You I Wind Land and Sea is the second studio album from American singer-songwriter Justin Nozuka.

Track listing

References

2010 albums
Justin Nozuka albums
Glassnote Records albums